Pyrenocarpon is a genus of lichenized fungi within the family Lichinaceae. It is monotypic, containing the single species Pyrenocarpon thelostomum.

References

External links
Pyrenocarpon at Index Fungorum

Lichinomycetes
Lichen genera